Susanne Daisley Lyons (born April 19, 1957) is an American businesswoman, and has been chair of the United States Olympic & Paralympic Committee (USOPC) since January 2019.

Lyons was born on April 19, 1957. She earned a bachelor's degree from Vassar College and an MBA from Boston University.

Lyons worked for Fidelity Investments, Russell Reynolds Associates, Charles Schwab Corporation, and Visa Inc., where she was chief marketing officer.

Lyons was unanimously elected chair of USOPC, effective January 1, 2019, after being an independent member of the board since December 2010.

References

Living people
International Olympic Committee members
Presidents of the United States Olympic Committee
Vassar College alumni
Boston University School of Management alumni
1957 births